Oldřich Blažíček (January 5, 1887 in Slavkovice, Nové Město na Moravě -  May 3, 1953 in Prague) was a Czech painter, representative of  modern landscape paintings.

He came from very humble beginnings. His father was a rural tailor. He apprenticed with his brother at a house as a painter and then went to Prague for work. He passed after four years at the Academy, where he graduated under Hanus Schwaiger. There he became acquainted with many colleagues, many notable figures such as Otto Gutfreund, Jan Štursa, Rudolf Kremlička, Josef Čapek, and many others. He, however, to any creative group entered.

Aside from being a noted landscape painter of his native Highlands, he was also famous for painting church interiors which brought him major success. His early painting of St Vitus Cathedral for instance was widely acclaimed by the Academy. He became a professor of painting at the CTU, where he worked until 1927 to 1948. Already in 1913, he had participated in exhibitions of the Union of Artists in Poznań and Ljubljana, followed by many others. He was awarded in Paris in 1921.

He died on 3 May 1953 in Prague. He wrote his memoirs in the book  Mládí na Vysočině (Youth in the Highlands).

Works

 Pvní jarní den - 1928
 U selského dvora- 1926
 Na večer v předjaří - 1925
 Doba velikonoční - 1930
 Na samotínku - 1928
 Rybníček ve Slavíkově - 1927

See also
List of Czech painters

References

1887 births
1953 deaths
People from Nové Město na Moravě
Academy of Fine Arts, Prague alumni
20th-century Czech painters
20th-century Czech male artists
Czech male painters